Wekiva Springs or Wekiwa Springs may refer to:

Wekiva Springs, Florida, a community located 45 miles north of Orlando, Florida
Wekiwa Springs State Park, a state park and natural spring located near the community
Wekiva River, the river which flows from the spring in the park
Wekiwa hydrobe, a species of gastropod in the family Hydrobiidae

See also
Wekiva, a synonym of the moth genus Peoria (moth)